William Campbell Heggie (7 June 1927 – 7 November 1977) was a Scottish professional footballer who played as a centre forward in the Football League.

References

1927 births
1977 deaths
Scottish footballers
Leeds United F.C. players
Accrington Stanley F.C. (1891) players
Wrexham A.F.C. players
New Brighton A.F.C. players
English Football League players
Jeanfield Swifts F.C. players
Association football forwards